The 2018–19 season is Preston North End's 139th season in existence, and their fourth consecutive season in the Championship. Along with the Championship, the club will also compete in the FA Cup and EFL Cup. The season covers the period from 1 July 2018 to 30 June 2019.

Season review

Pre-season
Paul Huntington, the club's longest-serving current player since he arrived from Yeovil Town in July 2012, signed a new three-year contract. He made 46 appearances last season. Other new contracts were signed during the summer by Alan Browne, Tom Clarke, Darnell Fisher, Paul Gallagher and Sean Maguire.

Striker Eoin Doyle transferred to Bradford City on 1 August for an undisclosed fee and signed a two-year contract. On the same day, Preston announced that Billy Bodin had a knee ligament injury and would be out of action for up to six months. Sean Maguire, who had recently renewed his contract, was out for "the first few weeks of the season" with a hamstring injury.

August
Preston signed two forwards on season-long loans from Manchester City. They are Lukas Nmecha, who is an England U-21 striker, and Brandon Barker, an England U-20 winger. Both made their debuts in the club's second EFL Championship match, away to Swansea City on 11 August.

Daryl Horgan transferred to Hibernian on 10 August for an undisclosed fee and signed a three-year contract. Horgan had appeared a substitute in the opening match against QPR.

Squad

 All appearances and goals up to date as of 5 May 2019.

Statistics

|-
!colspan=14|Players currently on loan:

|-
!colspan=14|Players who left during the season:

|}

Goals record

Disciplinary record

Contracts

Transfers

Transfers in

Transfers out

Loans in

Loans out

Pre-season friendlies
PNE announced they will compete with Bamber Bridge, AFC Fylde, West Ham United and Burnley during pre-season.

Competitions

Championship

League table

Result summary

Results by matchday

Matches
On 21 June 2018, the Championship fixtures for the forthcoming season were announced.

FA Cup

The third round draw was made live on BBC by Ruud Gullit and Paul Ince from Stamford Bridge on 3 December 2018.

EFL Cup

On 15 June 2018, the draw for the first round was made in Vietnam. The second round draw was done on 16 August. The third round draw was made on 30 August 2018 by David Seaman and Joleon Lescott.

References

Preston North End
Preston North End F.C. seasons